Alaki Sahra (also Romanized as Ālakī Şaḩrā; also known as Ālakīmaḩalleh) is a village in Layalestan Rural District, in the Central District of Lahijan County, Gilan Province, Iran. At the 2006 census, its population was 75, in 26 families.

References 

Populated places in Lahijan County